Weightlifting at the 2007 Southeast Asian Games was held in the College Assembly Hall, Nakhon Ratchasima Vocational College, Nakhon Ratchasima, Thailand

Medal tally

Medalists

Men

Women

External links
Southeast Asian Games Official Results

2007 Southeast Asian Games events
Southeast Asian Games
2007
International weightlifting competitions hosted by Thailand